Verbascum pulverulentum, the hoary mullein or broad-leaf mullein, is a species of flowering plant in the family Scrophulariaceae. It is native to central and southern Europe, and has been introduced to Austria, Madeira, and Washington state in the US. It is a specialist on coastal shingle, and so is preadapted to human-influenced habitats such as old quarries and gravel pits, road verges, railway embankments, and similar disturbed stony ground.

References

pulverulentum
Flora of Great Britain
Flora of Belgium
Flora of Germany
Flora of Switzerland
Flora of Hungary
Flora of Southwestern Europe
Flora of Southeastern Europe
Plants described in 1779